Ivaylo Rusev (born 19 April 1987) is a Bulgarian footballer, who plays as a defender.

References

External links

1987 births
Living people
Bulgarian footballers
PFC Svetkavitsa players
FC Etar 1924 Veliko Tarnovo players
PFC Spartak Varna players
FC Sozopol players
FC Botev Vratsa players
SFC Etar Veliko Tarnovo players
First Professional Football League (Bulgaria) players

Association football defenders